Gasperis is a surname. Notable people with the surname include:

Alfredo De Gasperis (1934–2013), Italian-Canadian developer
Kai (Alessia De Gasperis Brigante, born 1980), Canadian singer and songwriter

See also
Gasperi

Surnames from given names